The 2012 Wisconsin Badgers football team represent the University of Wisconsin–Madison in the 2012 NCAA Division I FBS football season. The Badgers, led by seventh-year head coach Bret Bielema, through December 4, 2012, and Barry Alvarez for the Rose Bowl are members of the Leaders Division of the Big Ten Conference and play their home games at Camp Randall Stadium. The Badgers lost their final game 20-14 in the Rose Bowl to the Stanford Cardinal of the Pac-12 Conference on January 1, 2013.

Recruiting

Watchlists/Preseason awards

 Jared Abbrederis
 Biletnikoff Award
 Montee Ball
 Doak Walker Award
 Maxwell Award
 Walter Camp Award
 Chris Borland
 Bednarik Award
 Butkus Award
 Lombardi Award
 Nagurski Trophy
 Travis Frederick
 Lombardi Award
 Outland Trophy
 Rimington Trophy
 Jacob Pedersen
 Mackey Award
 Mike Taylor
 Lombardi Award
 Nagurski Trophy
 Ricky Wagner
 Lombardi Award
 Outland Trophy
 James White
 Doak Walker Award

Schedule

Rankings

Regular season

Northern Iowa

Statistical Leaders
 Rushing: Montee Ball – 32 Car, 120 Yds, 1 TD
 Passing: Danny O'Brien – 19/23, 219 Yds, 2 TDs
 Receiving: Jared Abbrederis – 6 Rec, 84 Yds, 2 TDs
 Defense: Mike Taylor – 13 Tkls, 2.0 TFL, PBU

at Oregon State

Statistical Leaders
 Rushing: Montee Ball – 15 Car, 61 Yds
 Passing: Danny O'Brien – 20/38, 172 Yds, TD, INT
 Receiving: Jacob Pedersen – 4 Rec, 36 Yds, TD
 Defense: Ethan Armstrong – 10 Tkls

Utah State
Sources:
 

Statistical Leaders
 Rushing: Montee Ball – 37 Car, 139 Yds, TD
 Passing: Danny O'Brien – 5/10, 63 Yds
 Receiving: Brian Wozniak – 2 Rec, 24 Yds
 Defense: Mike Taylor – 15 Tkls, TFL

UTEP

Statistical Leaders
 Rushing: James White – 15 Car, 65 Yds, 2 TDs
 Passing: Joel Stave – 12/17, 217 Yds, TD, INT
 Receiving: Jared Abbrederis – 6 Rec, 147 Yds, TD
 Defense: Chris Borland – 12 Tkls, 2 sack, 3.5 TFL, 2 PBU

at Nebraska

Statistical Leaders
 Rushing: Montee Ball – 31 Car, 93 Yds, 3 TDs
 Passing: Joel Stave – 12/23, 214 Yds, TD
 Receiving: Jared Abbrederis – 7 Rec, 142 Yds, TD
 Defense: Mike Taylor – 15 Tkls, 1.0 TFL

Illinois

Statistical Leaders
 Rushing: Montee Ball – 19 Car, 116 Yds, 2 TDs
 Passing: Joel Stave – 16/25, 254 Yds, 2 TDs, INT
 Receiving: Jared Abbrederis – 7 Rec, 117 Yds, TD
 Defense: Mike Taylor – 12 Tkls, 1.5 TFL

at Purdue

Statistical Leaders
 Rushing: Montee Ball – 29 Car, 247 Yds, 3 TDs
 Passing: Joel Stave – 12/21, 178 Yds, TD, INT
 Receiving: Jacob Pedersen – 4 Rec, 77 Yds, TD
 Defense: Chris Borland – 7 Tkls, 2.0 TFL, Sack

Minnesota

Statistical Leaders
 Rushing: James White – 15 Car, 175 Yds, 3 TDs
 Passing: Joel Stave – 7/15, 106 Yds
 Receiving: Jared Abbrederis – 2 Rec, 68 Yds
 Defense: Mike Taylor – 12 Tkls, 1.0 TFL

Michigan State

Statistical Leaders
 Rushing: Montee Ball – 22 Car, 46 Yds
 Passing: Joel Stave – 9/11, 127 Yds, TD
 Receiving: Jacob Pedersen – 3 Rec, 65 Yds, TD
 Defense: Ethan Armstrong – 8 Tkls, 1.0 TFL, QBH

at Indiana

Statistical Leaders
 Rushing: Montee Ball – 27 Car, 208 Yds, 3 TDs
 Passing: Curt Phillips – 4/7, 41 Yds, TD
 Receiving: Sam Arneson – 1 Rec, 2 Yds, TD
 Defense: Chris Borland – 8 Tkls, 0.5 TFL, FR

Ohio State

Statistical Leaders
 Rushing: Montee Ball – 39 Car, 191 Yds, TD
 Passing: Curt Phillips – 14/25, 154 Yds, TD
 Receiving: Jacob Pedersen – 6 Rec, 66 Yds, TD
 Defense: Shelton Johnson – 11 Tkls, PBU

Notes
 During the game, there was a ceremony to honor the 1962 Wisconsin Badgers football team on the 50th anniversary of their Big Ten Championship.

at Penn State

Statistical Leaders
 Rushing: Montee Ball – 27 Car, 111 Yds, TD
 Passing: Curt Phillips – 12/25, 191 Yds, 2 TDs, INT
 Receiving: Melvin Gordon – 1 Rec, 57 Yds, TD
 Defense: Mike Taylor – 11 Tkls, 2 TFL, Sack, PBU

vs. Nebraska (Big Ten Championship)

Statistical Leaders
 Rushing: Montee Ball – 21 Car, 202 Yds, 3 TDs
 Passing: Curt Phillips – 6/8, 71 Yds
 Receiving: Sam Arneson – 1 Rec, 3 Yds, TD
 Defense: Marcus Cromartie – 7 Tkls, INT, 2 PBUs, TD

Notables
Wisconsin had 2 running backs run for over 200 yards (Montee Ball and Melvin Gordon) and Badgers running backs accounted for 8 rushing touchdowns on the day (along with a passing touchdown by running back James White). The 70 points tied the second-highest mark in Wisconsin history, set against Northwestern in 2010 and Austin Peay in 2010 (the Wisconsin record for most points in a game is 83 against Indiana in 2010). The Badgers returned their first interception for a touchdown, as senior defensive back Marcus Cromartie returned a deflected Taylor Martinez pass 29 yards to put Wisconsin up 14-0 less than 3 minutes into the game.

A wild rushing touchdown by Taylor Martinez and a Brett Maher field goal narrowed Wisconsin's advantage to 14-10, but the Badgers went 45 yards on two plays to set up another scoring drive, capped off by a 9-yard rushing touchdown by James White. When Nebraska's offense stalled, Wisconsin's offense roared into gear and scored three more touchdowns in the 2nd quarter alone, taking a 42-10 lead at the half with a James White passing touchdown to TE Sam Arneson.

In the second half, Nebraska managed to gain a grand total of 3 yards before Martinez threw his second interception on Nebraska's first drive of the half. Wisconsin scored on the next play, taking a 49-10 lead.

The Badgers secured their third consecutive Big Ten Championship and a third consecutive Rose Bowl berth with the blowout win, improving to 8-5 on the year and snapping their 2-game losing streak.

On December 4, 2012, head coach Bret Bielema announced he would take the head coaching vacancy at the University of Arkansas, ending his career at Wisconsin after 7 seasons (from 2006 to 2012). Bielema had a 68-24 overall record in 7 seasons at Wisconsin and his teams went 37-19 in Big Ten conference games. In addition, Bielema won both of the first two Big Ten Conference Championship Games.

vs. Stanford (Rose Bowl)

Statistical Leaders
 Rushing: Montee Ball – 24 Car, 100 Yds, TD
 Passing: Curt Phillips – 10/16, 83 Yds, TD, INT
 Receiving: Jared Abbrederis – 3 Rec, 44 Yds
 Defense: Chris Borland – 9 Tkls

Awards

 Jared Abbrederis
First Team All-Big Ten (Consensus)
 Beau Allen
All-Big Ten Honorable mention (Consensus)
 Montee Ball
Ameche-Dayne Running Back of the Year
First Team All-Big Ten (Consensus)
First Team All-American (American Football Coaches Association, Associated Press, ESPN)
Consensus All-American
Jim Brown Award
Doak Walker Award
 Chris Borland
First Team All-Big Ten (Coaches) / Honorable mention (Media)
 Marcus Cromartie
All-Big Ten Honorable mention (Consensus)
 Travis Frederick
First Team All-Big Ten (Media) / Honorable mention (Coaches)
 David Gilbert
All-Big Ten Honorable mention (Consensus)
 Ryan Groy
Second Team All-Big Ten (Coaches) / Honorable mention (Media)
 Ethan Hemer
All-Big Ten Honorable mention (Coaches)
 Drew Meyer
All-Big Ten Honorable mention (Media)
 Jacob Pedersen
Kwalick-Clark Tight End of the Year
First Team All-Big Ten (Coaches) / Honorable mention (Media)
 Devin Smith
Second Team All-Big Ten (Media) / Honorable mention (Coaches)
 Dezmen Southward
All-Big Ten Honorable mention (Consensus)
 Mike Taylor
First Team All-Big Ten (Media) / Honorable mention (Coaches)
 Ricky Wagner
First Team All-Big Ten (Consensus)
Second Team All-American (CBS Sports)

Roster

2012 statistics

Passing
Note: G = Games played; COMP = Completions; ATT = Attempts; COMP % = Completion percentage; YDS = Passing yards; TD = Passing touchdowns; INT = Interceptions; EFF = Passing efficiency

Rushing
Note: G = Games played; ATT = Attempts; YDS = Yards; AVG = Average yard per carry; LG = Longest run; TD = Rushing touchdowns

Receiving
Note: G = Games played; REC = Receptions; YDS = Yards; AVG = Average yard per catch; LG = Longest catch; TD = Receiving touchdowns

Kick and punt returning
Note: G = Games played; PR = Punt returns; PYDS = Punt return yards; PLG = Punt return long; KR = Kick returns; KYDS = Kick return yards; KLG = Kick return long; TD = Total return touchdowns

Kicking
Note: G = Games played; FGM = Field goals made; FGA = Field goals attempted; LG = Field goal long; XPT = Extra points made; XPT ATT = XPT attempted; TP = Total points

Punting
Note: G = Games played; P = Punts; YDS = Yards; AVG = Average per punt; LG = Punt long; In20 = Punts inside the 20; TB = Touchbacks

Defensive
Note: G = Games played; Solo = Solo tackles; Ast = Assisted tackles; Total = Total tackles; TFL-Yds = Tackles for loss-yards lost; Sack = Sacks; INT = Interceptions; PDef = Passes defended ; FF = Forced fumbles; FR = Forced recoveries

Regular starters

Notes
 December 4, 2012 – Head coach Bret Bielema accepted the vacant coaching position at Arkansas for next season. He was not present as head coach for the 2013 Rose Bowl
 December 5, 2012 – Athletic Director Barry Alvarez announced that he will be taking over the head coaching role for the 2013 Rose Bowl.
 December 6, 2012 – Montee Ball was voted the best running back in the nation in the Doak Walker Award, finishing just ahead of Johnathan Franklin of UCLA.
 January 1, 2013 – Tailback Montee Ball became the first player in Rose Bowl Game history to score a touchdown in three straight years.

2013 NFL Draft class

Signed undrafted free agents
 CB Marcus Cromartie, San Diego Chargers
 CB Devin Smith, Dallas Cowboys

References

External links
 

Wisconsin
Wisconsin Badgers football seasons
Big Ten Conference football champion seasons
Wisconsin Badgers football